Harry Woods (12 March 1890 – 1956) was an English footballer who played as an inside forward. He initially trained as a glass worker whilst playing as an amateur for St Helens Recreation, and then Ashton Town and St Helens Town. In 1911, he joined Norwich City, then in the Southern League, where he played until the outbreak of World War I, making 151 appearances and scoring 37 goals in all competitions.

Woods served in the Tank Corps in France during the war, and finally began his Football League career with South Shields, then in the Second Division, in August 1919. After two seasons with the club, during which he scored 24 times in 95 games, which earned him a £2600 move to Newcastle United in January 1922. Woods failed to settle at St James' Park, however, managing just two goals in 16 appearances before he joined Arsenal on 25 August 1923. He scored ten goals in his first season, helping the Gunners to narrowly avoid relegation, but after Jimmy Brain made his first-team debut in October 1924 and established himself in the side, Woods' opportunities were limited. The team's form improved dramatically after Herbert Chapman was appointed manager in 1925, but Woods played only three times under him, and left for Luton Town in August 1926, where he scored 27 goals in 105 games. He moved back into non-league football with North Shields in 1930.

Woods died in 1956.

References

Sources
 

1890 births
1956 deaths
People from St Helens, Merseyside
English footballers
Association football inside forwards
Ashton Town A.F.C. players
St Helens Town A.F.C. players
Norwich City F.C. players
South Shields F.C. (1889) players
Newcastle United F.C. players
Arsenal F.C. players
Luton Town F.C. players
North Shields F.C. players
Southern Football League players
English Football League players
British Army personnel of World War I
Royal Tank Regiment soldiers
Military personnel from Merseyside
Military personnel from Lancashire